Ryan Kankowski (born 14 October 1985) is a South African professional rugby union player, who played for the South Africa national rugby union team between 2007 and 2012.

Kankowski plays at number eight or openside flanker.

Kankowski was first selected to represent South Africa during the Springboks 2007 end of year tour to Wales and England. He made a try-scoring test debut on the tour as a substitute during South Africa's 34–12 victory over Wales at the Millennium Stadium on 24 November 2007.

Thirteen of his twenty test caps were earned as a substitute. His most productive year was in 2008, receiving award nominations for his performances at Super Rugby and provincial level and was subsequently rewarded by being part of the Springboks Incoming Tour, their Tri Nations squad and their end of year Outgoing Tour. He was also part of the Springbok squad selected to play three tests against the British & Irish Lions on their tour of South Africa in 2009.

In June 2012, it was announced that he would join Japanese team Toyota Verblitz for six months. He would miss the 2012 Currie Cup Premier Division season with the, but would return to the for the 2013 Super Rugby season.

Awards and nominations

2008 SA Rugby Player of the Year nominee
2008 Sasol Player of the Year nominee
2008 Vodacom Super 14 South African Player of the Year
2008 ABSA Currie Cup – Premier Division Player of the Year nominee

References

External links

SARugby.com profile
Sharks profile
itsrugby.co.uk profile
www.ryankankowski.co.za
Springbok Rugby Hall of Fame

Living people
1985 births
South African rugby union players
South Africa international rugby union players
Sharks (rugby union) players
Sharks (Currie Cup) players
Rugby union number eights
Alumni of St. Andrew's College, Grahamstown
South African people of Polish descent
White South African people
Toyota Industries Shuttles Aichi players
South African expatriate rugby union players
South African expatriate sportspeople in Japan
Expatriate rugby union players in Japan
South Africa international rugby sevens players
Male rugby sevens players
Rugby sevens players at the 2006 Commonwealth Games
Commonwealth Games rugby sevens players of South Africa
Rugby union players from Port Elizabeth